Zhu Min or Min Zhu may refer to:

 Zhu Min (economist) (born 1952), Chinese economist
 Min Zhu (entrepreneur) (born 1948), Chinese-born American computer scientist, entrepreneur, and philanthropist
 Zhu Min (fencer) (born 1988), Chinese sabre fencer
 Zhu Min (Russian language professor) (1926–2009), Chinese professor and daughter of Zhu De

See also
 Zhu (surname)
 Democracy#Translation which discusses the word 民主 mínzhǔ (reverse of "Zhu Min")